Tu Huo Qiang (Chinese: 突火枪; Pinyin: tūhuǒqiāng) was one of the earliest true guns. It consisted of a moso bamboo tube which had been partially hollowed out and loaded with gunpowder and a single projectile, called the zi kē (子窠). The gunpowder utilized in this time period did not have much explosive potential, and upon igniting the fuse, the Tu Huo Qiang more often than not shot out flames and smoke as much as the projectile itself. This weapon did not have much killing potential and was mainly used for its shock value as well as psychological advantage.

See also
 Wujing Zongyao
 Huolongjing

References
https://web.archive.org/web/20131211130155/http://www.grandhistorian.com/chinesesiegewarfare/index-english12122007.html

Early firearms
Firearms of China
Chinese inventions
Military history of Imperial China